Carl Walther Meyer was a German stage and film actor and film editor. Meyer appeared in more than fifty productions during the silent and early sound eras.

Selected filmography
 Women Who Fall by the Wayside (1925)
 The Royal Grenadiers (1925)
 The Adventurous Wedding (1925)
 The Heart of a German Mother (1926)
 Little Inge and Her Three Fathers  (1926)
 The Seventh Son (1926)
 Klettermaxe (1927)
 Valencia (1927)
 At Ruedesheimer Castle There Is a Lime Tree (1928)
 Assassination (1927)
 German Women - German Faithfulness (1927)
 Leontine's Husbands (1928)
 Eva in Silk (1928)
 Suzy Saxophone (1928)
 The Call of the North (1929)
 The Caviar Princess (1930)
 Paprika (1932)
 The Ringer (1932)
 The Love Hotel (1933)
 Heinz in the Moon (1934)
 Music in the Blood (1934)
 Holiday From Myself (1934)
 Winter Night's Dream (1935)
 Paul and Pauline (1936)
 The Empress's Favourite  (1936)

References

Bibliography
 Rolf Giesen & Manfred Hobsch. Hitlerjunge Quex, Jud Süss und Kolberg. Schwarzkopf & Schwarzkopf, 2005.

External links

1898 births
1985 deaths
German male film actors
German male stage actors
German male silent film actors
20th-century German male actors
Actors from Dresden